Vaida is a small borough in Rae Parish, Harju County, northern Estonia. Vaida has a population of 990 (as of 1 January 2010).

Vaida was first mentioned in 1241 in the Danish Census Book. Vaida Manor (Wait) was established in the 1630s, during the almost three centuries of existence the manor had many owners. The 1-storey main building from the beginning of the 19th century was burned down during the 1905 Revolution. In 1911 an ethnic Estonian Jaan Saar built a new wooden main building, but this also burned down in 1945. Nowadays mainly the park has remained from the former manor.

In the Soviet times a sovkhoz operated in Vaida.

Nowadays there are primary school, library and a post office in Vaida.

References

External links
Vaida small borough association 
Vaida primary school 
Vaida Library 

Boroughs and small boroughs in Estonia
Rae Parish